|}

The Cairn Rouge Stakes is a Listed flat horse race in Ireland open to thoroughbred fillies and mares aged three years or older. It is run at Killarney over a distance of 1 mile and 100 yards (1,701 metres), and it is scheduled to take place each year in July.

The race was first run in 2014. It is named in honour of Cairn Rouge, an Irish-trained filly who won the Irish 1,000 Guineas and Champion Stakes in 1980.

Records

Leading jockey (2 wins):
Declan McDonogh – Creggs Pipes (2016), Bella Estrella (2018)
Wayne Lordan - Off Limit (2015), Lovelier (2020)

Leading trainer (2 wins):
 Aidan O'Brien  – Palace (2014), Lovelier (2020)

Winners

See also
 Horse racing in Ireland
 List of Irish flat horse races

References
Racing Post:

Flat races in Ireland
Mile category horse races for fillies and mares
Killarney Racecourse
Recurring sporting events established in 2014
2014 establishments in Ireland